Worms 4: Mayhem is a 3D artillery turn-based tactics video game in the Worms series developed by Team17 that was released in 2005. It is the direct successor to 2003's Worms 3D.

Plot
The player's team of worms arrives at Worminkle University, where they meet Professor Worminkle, who trains the team to use various weapons. Worminkle then sets the team assignments to sneak into enemy buildings and destroy their construction sites. To flee government agents, Worminkle and the team travel back in time to the Middle Ages using Worminkle's time machine, but the machine gets damaged as they are ambushed by wizards and knights. After fighting through them, the team proceed to the Wild West to find gold to keep the machine powered, fighting Boggy the Kid in the process, and to Ancient Arabia to recover jewels stolen by Ali Baboon and his pesky thieves and keep the machine's navigation controls balanced.

After recovering the jewels, Worminkle fixes the machine, but accidentally drops a letter. The team reads the letter, which reveals that the government was planning to build a new research laboratory to replace Worminkle University. Worminkle quickly takes the letter back and continues the journey with the team. However, they end up travelling far back to the Stone Age, where Worminkle betrays the team, revealing to them that he actually used them as part of his plan to escape from the Government. Planning to abandon the team in the Stone Age, he flees, but crashes into a mountain, forcing him to fix the time machine.

Determined to catch Worminkle, the team battle through caveworms and dinoworms. Once they manage to reach Worminkle on a volcano island, the team, having acknowledged what he did to them, steals the time machine and travels back to the present day, leaving Worminkle stranded in the Stone Age.

Gameplay
Gameplay follows on that of Worms 3D, in which teams of worms take turns to use a variety of weapons and items in order to eliminate the opposing team(s). New features include the ability to customize their worm's appearance as well as create their own unique weapons in a new feature called "The Weapon Factory". The game also contains a shop where players can buy various items, using points won by completing story missions, challenges, or unlocking trophies. Shop items include new maps, new accessories and attire, personality banks (voices) and game styles.

In a series first, Worms 4'''s story mode provides cutscenes before each mission to reveal background information. The game also has additional game modes, such as Challenge mode, which presents the player with various missions to complete. Multiplayer mode is available via Hotseat. Online mode is also available on the PC version and was available on Xbox through Xbox live prior to 2010.

ReceptionWorms 4: Mayhem received mixed to positive reviews. Critics generally criticized the game for its lack of difference from previous 3D Worms'' games, difficult controls and illogical AI. However, the range of weapons were praised for including new and existing weapons, along with the level design.

References

External links
 
  

2005 video games
Artillery video games
Codemasters games
Lua (programming language)-scripted video games
Majesco Entertainment games
PlayStation 2 games
Strategy video games
Video games about time travel
Video games scored by Bjørn Lynne
Windows games
 07
Xbox games
Video games developed in the United Kingdom